Feminine Masculinity, also known as Mr. Diana, is a 1999 Hong Kong television drama produced by TVB. It stars Gallen Lo, Flora Chan, Kwong Wa, Nicola Cheung, Angela Tong, and Florence Kwok. The drama is about Tang Ping-kuen, the village head of Lucky Village, who is always at loggerheads with businesswoman Christine Fong. One day, Christine was shot dead during a paintball game. Since then, the spirit of Christine could not rest in peace until she finds out who murdered her. She decides to take host on Kuen's body. Since then, Kuen became known as Diana to his colleagues once Christine possesses him.

Cast
 Flora Chan as Christine Fong, the main protagonist.
 Gallen Lo as Tang Ping-kuen / Diana Szema, the village head of Lucky Village whom Christine's ghost takes host of after she dies.
 Kwong Wa as Andrew Cheung, Christine's husband.
 Nicola Cheung as Sardonna Fong, Christine's younger sister.
 Angela Tong as Sophia So, Christine's secretary.
 Florence Kwok as Francoise Lee, Christine's rival.
 Dickson Lee as Inspector William Chung, the inspector in charge of investigating Christine's death.
 Koo Ming-wah as Jacky Fong, Christine's younger brother.
 Ku Feng as Officer Tommy Tang, Kuen's uncle and William's subordinate who has extrasensory perception.
 Lo Mang as Tang Siu-fung and Kenny Wong as Kiu Muk, Kuen's two best friends.
 Teresa Ha as Chan Shuk-ying, Kuen's aunt.
 Fung So-bor as Law Pik-kuen, Christine's mother.
 Joe Junior as Joe Leung, Christine's boss.
 Steven Ho as Choi, Lee Wai-kei as Michael Tang, and Lee Chi-kei as Chung, Christine's subordinates.

TVB dramas
1999 Hong Kong television series debuts
1999 Hong Kong television series endings
Hong Kong comedy television series
Supernatural television series
Mystery television series
Serial drama television series
1990s Hong Kong television series